Versus (Versace) was a diffusion line of the Italian luxury fashion house Versace. It began in 1989 and was a gift by the founder Gianni Versace to his sister, Donatella Versace. After closing in 2005, it was resurrected by Donatella in 2009 with a capsule collection of accessories designed by emerging British designer Christopher Kane. In 2018, Versace integrated Versus with another diffusion line of the brand, Versace Jeans, forming Versace Jeans Couture, which currently operates as the company's only diffusion line.

Brand 
Gianni Versace introduced Versus in 1989 stating that, "Versus was born with an innate creative approach, with a strong focus on innovation, and a flair for the unconventional. An artistic force that takes present fashion forward, anticipating new trends and embracing challenge".

Versus was endorsed by many celebrities including Zayn Malik, Jennifer Lopez, Cheryl Cole, Leighton Meester, Miranda Cosgrove and Alexa Chung, and featured in and on the cover of fashion and lifestyle magazines like Vogue, InStyle, ELLE and Glamour.

History 
After the success of Gianni, Versace SpA in the early and mid-1980s, the company's founder Gianni Versace created the house's secondary line, Versus, as a gift to Donatella, his sister, muse, and vice-president of the company.

The first fashion show was presented in Milan in 1990. Between 1995 and 2003, each season's collection of ready-to-wear, accessories, eyewear, and watches was presented in New York during New York Fashion Week. Versus was known for its distinctive rock-chic look that Donatella favored and used to influence the house's main collections. During 2004, when the company was facing a downturn in profits, Versus was reduced to a limited collection of accessories, eventually being shut down with the final show; the menswear spring/summer collection 2005.

In 2009, Donatella Versace began a stylistic collaboration with English designer Christopher Kane, marking the re-launch of the brand in February 2009 with a special "capsule of accessories", distributed through selected multi-brand stores. After working with Kane, M.I.A. created a capsule collection. In December 2013, Versace announced that Anthony Vaccarello would create a capsule collection for Versus.

Christopher Kane (2009–2012) 
Having acted as a consultant at Versace after Donatella acclaimed his MA collection for Central Saint Martins College of Art and Design, Donatella invited Scottish designer Christopher Kane to re-launch the line with her in February 2009 with a capsule collection of handbags, shoes, and jewelry. For spring/summer 2010, Kane presented 16 dresses for the line at Milan Fashion Week. He has since presented two other collections for the line, fall/winter 2009/2010 and most recently spring/summer 2011, his first official runway collection at Milan Fashion Week.

Donatella has likened Kane to her brother, the late Gianni Versace. Since Gianni died in 1997, she has become the creative director of the house's main line and other surviving diffusion lines.

JW Anderson (2013–2014) 
Irish designer Jonathan Anderson collaborated for a capsule collection with Versus in 2013. This collaboration was unexpected due to the contrasting styles of the brands. Donatella said of Anderson that "[He] was very "loyal" to the Versus codes" Anderson launched his label JW Anderson in 2008 and was named the creative director of Loewe in September 2013.

Anthony Vaccarello (2014–2016) 
Anthony Vaccarello began working with Versus in 2014 and exited in 2016 to become Creative Director for Saint Laurent.

References

External links

Versace
High fashion brands
Clothing brands of Italy
Privately held companies of Italy
Luxury brands
Fashion accessory brands
Clothing companies established in 1989
1989 establishments in Italy
Companies based in Milan
Eyewear brands of Italy
Watch manufacturing companies of Italy